is a Japanese singer and actor. He debuted in 1965 with the single .

Career
He currently makes consistent appearances on television, performs occasional seasonal tours, hosts a late night talk show, and is involved in a number of stage plays. In 2005, he enjoyed a revival when his music was used in the popular Japanese TV-series Kamen Rider Hibiki with its ending theme  and later its second opening theme .

Personal life
He married the actress Olivia Hussey in 1980 and later divorced in 1989 after he was unable to attain work in the United States and Olivia was unable to relocate her first-born son, Alexander Gunther Martin, to Japan. They had one child, son Maximillian Fuse.

Trivia
Gen Hoshino created the parody character "Akira Nise" (ニセ明, Nise Akira, literally Fake Akira) as a tribute to Akira Fuse.

Guest role 
Fuse guest starred in Kamen Rider Hibiki as the senior former Oni master, who gifts Hibiki the Armed Saber (episodes 32–33).

Film
Tora-san, the Matchmaker (1979)
Welcome Back, Mr. McDonald (1997)
Minna no Ie (2001) : Hirinouchi

References

1947 births
Living people
Singers from Tokyo
Japanese male singers
Universal Music Japan artists
Japanese male actors